Mahmudul Haque Liton (born 13 December 1964), is a retired Bangladeshi football player and manager.

Playing career
Liton started his career in the Dhaka First Division Volleyball in 1978. In 1981, he trialed for East End Club, however he registered for Victoria SC in the Dhaka Football League. After failing to make an appearance for Victoria SC, he joined East End Club in the mid-season window. In 1982, he played for Bangladesh Green team in the President's Gold Cup. In 1983, Liton joined Brothers Union, and was later made the club's captain. In 1985, he scored against Abahani Krira Chakra during the title deciding match which Brothers ended up losing 2–3. During the 1984 South Asian Games, Liton established himself as a regular in the national team. In 1987, he suffered a major injury during a league encounter with Dhaka Wanderers, which kept him out of the game for months. In 1989, he joined Abahani Limited Dhaka where he won both the 1989 Dhaka League and 1990 Independence Cup. He retired in 1995 after winning the Dhaka First Division League with East End Club.

Managerial career
In 1992, Liton was the coach cum player at Wari Club, and guided the club to an eight place finish in the Dhaka League. In 1993 he was the captained and managed East End Club. In 1996 he completed a coaching course in Sri Lanka and the following year he coached the Sri Lanka U20 team. In 1999, he completed the AFC B license course. In the professional league era, Liton coached Sheikh Russel KC, and guided them to third place finish in 2010–11 Bangladesh League. He was also the head coach of Feni SC during both 2012–2013 and 2015 league seasons. He caoched Rahmatganj MFS to promotion to the Bangladesh Premier League, by winning the 2014 Bangladesh Championship League. He also managed Dhaka Wanderers and  Agrani Bank in the Championship League.

Honours

Player
Abahani Krira Chakra
 Dhaka League =   1989–90
 Independence Cup = 1990

East End Club
 Dhaka First Division Football League =  1995

 Bangladesh 
 South Asian Games Silver medal = 1984

Manager
Rahmatganj MFS
Bangladesh Championship League = 2014

References

Living people
1964 births
People from Khulna District
Bangladeshi footballers
Bangladesh international footballers
Association football forwards
Abahani Limited (Dhaka) players
Brothers Union players
Bangladeshi football coaches
Bangladeshi football managers